Anna Bongiorni (born 15 September 1993) is an Italian sprinter, whose most prestigious achievement at the international individual senior level is the bronze medal at the Universiade (in 200 m in 2018). Bongiorni is a two-time national champion at senior individual level (60 m indoor 2017 and 2018). She competed at the 2020 Summer Olympics, in 100 m.

Biography

She competed in the 4 × 100 metres relay event at the 2015 World Championships in Athletics in Beijing, China. She has won three bronze medals internationally, at the 2017 Summer Universiade in and at the 2018 Mediterranean Games (one in these relay race). In the national career she won two absolute individual titles at senior level (60 m in 2017 and 2018), and others minor titles in relay (4×100 and 4×200 m), five medals won overall, six youths (two times the 100 m student and the same 4×100 m from cadet, once the coupled 100-200 m from promises) and two University (100 and 200 m).

She is the daughter of the Italian former sprinter Giovanni Bongiorni, in June 2019, she graduated in medicine.

Statistics

National records
 4×100 m relay: 42.90 (Doha, Qatar, 4 October 2019), she ran third leg in the team with Johanelis Herrera, Gloria Hooper, Irene Siragusa - current holder

Progression

100 metres

200 metres

Achievements
Senior

National titles
She won three national championships at individual senior level.

Italian Athletics Championships
100 m: 2021
Italian Athletics Indoor Championships
60 m: 2017, 2018

See also
 2020 in 100 metres
 Italian all-time lists - 100 metres
 Italian national track relay team

Notes

References

External links

 

1993 births
Living people
Italian female sprinters
World Athletics Championships athletes for Italy
Athletes (track and field) at the 2010 Summer Youth Olympics
Universiade medalists in athletics (track and field)
Athletes (track and field) at the 2018 Mediterranean Games
Mediterranean Games bronze medalists for Italy
Athletics competitors of Centro Sportivo Carabinieri
Mediterranean Games medalists in athletics
Universiade bronze medalists for Italy
Medalists at the 2017 Summer Universiade
Athletes (track and field) at the 2020 Summer Olympics
Olympic athletes of Italy
Olympic female sprinters
20th-century Italian women
21st-century Italian women
European Athletics Championships medalists